HCI may refer to:

Computing
 Happy Computers, an American computer hardware manufacturer
 Home Computer Initiative, a United Kingdom government programme to increase computers usage
 Host controller interface (disambiguation), various computer interfaces
 Human–computer interaction, the study of how people interact with computers
 Human-computer interaction (security), the study of how people interact with computers concerning information security
 Hyper-converged infrastructure, an IT infrastructure framework for integrating storage, networking and virtualization computing in a data center.

Education
 Harbord Collegiate Institute, a school in Toronto, Canada
 Humberside Collegiate Institute, a school in Toronto, Canada
 Hwa Chong Institution, a school in Singapore

Science
 Highly charged ion
 Hot carriers injection, in solid-state electronic devices
 Hydrocarbon indicator, in reflection seismology

Organizations
 Handgun Control, Inc., the former name of the Brady Campaign to Prevent Gun Violence
 Harrisburg City Islanders, a soccer club from the United States
 HCI Books (Health Communications Inc), an American publishing house, see What the Bleep Do We Know!?
 Human Concern International, a Canadian relief and development organization
 Huntsman Cancer Institute, an American cancer research facility and hospital

Other uses 
 Heavy-Chemical Industry Drive, a former economic development plan of South Korea

See also
 HCL (disambiguation)
 HCIL (disambiguation)
 HCl (H-C-lowercase L), chemical formula of Hydrogen chloride